Several ships of the Swedish Navy have been named HSwMS Munin, named after the son of Thor in Norse mythology:

  was a torpedo boat launched in 1886 and which later was classified as patrol boat
  was a destroyer launched in 1911 and decommissioned in 1940
  was a  launched in 1942 and decommissioned in 1968
  was a  launched in 1977 and decommissioned in 2001

Swedish Navy ship names